The 2014 American Indoor Football season was the ninth season of American Indoor Football (AIF). The Baltimore Mariners defeated the Cape Fear Heroes 45-44 to claim their second ever AIF title.

Standings

 Green indicates clinched playoff berth
 Gray indicates best regular season record

Playoffs

Awards

Individual season awards

1st Team All-AIF

References

American Indoor Football seasons
AIF